Sir Thomas Russell Fairgrieve CBE (3 May 1924 – 17 February 1999) was a Scottish Conservative and Unionist politician.

He was educated at St. Mary's School, Melrose, Sedbergh School, and the Scottish College of Textiles. He served as a Major in the 8th Gurkha Rifles (Indian Army), 1946 and as a Major in the King's Own Scottish Borderers from 1956 to 1972.

He served as a Selkirk County and Galashiels Town Councillor from 1949 to 1959, and as Member of Parliament for Aberdeenshire West from February 1974 until 1983. He was Parliamentary Under-Secretary of State for Scotland from 1979 until 1981, and was a Member of the Council of Europe. He held a number of offices in the Scottish Conservative Association and was Chairman of the Conservative Party in Scotland from 1975 until 1980.

He held a number of business appointments, mainly in the textile, advertising and construction sectors.

He was appointed a CBE in 1974 and was knighted in 1981.

References

1924 births
1999 deaths
People educated at St. Mary's School, Melrose
People educated at Sedbergh School
Members of the Parliament of the United Kingdom for Scottish constituencies
British Indian Army officers
King's Own Scottish Borderers officers
Scottish Conservative Party MPs
Knights Bachelor
Commanders of the Order of the British Empire
Councillors in Scotland
UK MPs 1974
UK MPs 1974–1979
UK MPs 1979–1983
Indian Army personnel of World War II
People from Galashiels